John Sokol of Lamberg ( – 28 September 1410) was a military leader from Moravia who became known during the internal disputes of members of the Luxembourg dynasty and from his participation of the Battle of Grunwald.

Biography
John Sokol of Lamberg was born during the reign of Charles IV, Holy Roman Emperor. His father was Jaroslav III of Knínice, who sometime after 1360 moved to the village of Březník, and in 1370 likely built a castle there. Jaroslav became burgrave of Znojmo in 1356 and Hofmeister of John Henry, Margrave of Moravia in 1368. He later became involved in skirmishes between individual members of the ruling Luxembourg dynasty. 

The first verified mentions of John Sokol come from 1396, when he testified when donating property to his sister-in-law, the widow of Jaroslav of Lamberg. The first reports of his military actions are from 1397. They were subsequently excommunicated from the Church by the Bishop of Olomouc, . After the intervention of Margrave Jobst of Moravia, and promises of not harassing the land again, the new bishop  lifted the excommunication in 1403.

John Sokol inherited . He is known early in his career to have been in the service of Prokop of Moravia during the Moravian Margrave Wars, but he fought for Margrave Jobst when he seized the town of Laa an der Thaya in 1407, and was part of the defense against Leopold IV, Duke of Austria. John Sokol then entered the service of Leopold in his conflicts against Ernest, Duke of Austria.

By 1409, John Sokol was part of the retinue of King Wenceslas IV. Together with men such as Jan Žižka, Matthew the Leader, and Racek Kobyla, he waged a guerilla campaign against the Rosenberg family, enemies of Wenceslas. After the abduction of Wenceslas, John Sokol's tactics combined with John of Görlitz's political power contributed to his release. John Sokol was named provincial governor, and counted Henry III of Rosenberg, Sigismund of Luxembourg, and Albert II of Germany among his enemies.

Battle of Grunwald

In 1410, John Sokol assisted the Polish-Lithuanian coalition against the Teutonic Knights in the Battle of Grunwald. Together with Stanislav of Dobrá Voda, he commanded the fourth Polish banner of St. George, consisting of about 1,500 horsemen. After the victory of the Poles, he participated in the conquest of further castles and became the administrator of Radzyń Chełmiński Castle. After the Peace of Thorn, the castle was returned to the Teutonic Knights.

Death
John Sokol of Lamberg died on 28 September 1410 after a feast in Toruń, to which he was invited by Polish King Władysław II Jagiełło. The cause of death was allegedly improperly prepared fish, but it is speculated that he was intentionally poisoned. It is theorized that Jan Žižka, John Sokol's pupil and companion, may have contributed to his death.

Legacy

John Sokol was depicted in Alphonse Mucha's painting After the Battle of Grunewald (1924). In the left part of the painting, a figure in a crusader cloak kneels, and behind him stands a warrior in armor and a broad helmet. Directly behind him is Sokol and to the left next to him is Jan Žižka.

The appearance of John Sokol's coat of arms is not fully known. It has been described by August Sedláček, but the color palette is unknown as only the seal on a document from 1402 has been preserved.

John Sokol was depicted in the 2018 video game Kingdom Come: Deliverance. The Age of Empires II expansion released in 2021, Dawn of the Dukes, has Sokol in Jan Zizka's early campaign. He is portrayed as a mentor and father figure to Zizka, having had Zizka's charge of being a highwayman taken off his record allowing Zizka to re-enter society in good standing. Zizka in this rendition had absolutely nothing to do with his poisoning and was devastated by the sudden, surprise loss of his patron, most reliable noble protector and close friend.

References

Bibliography

14th-century births
1410 deaths
14th-century Bohemian people
15th-century Bohemian people
Medieval Bohemian nobility